Airport railway station or Biman Bandar railway station is a railway station in Dhaka, the capital of Bangladesh. Situated opposite to Hazrat Shahjalal International Airport, it can be accessed from the Airport Road.

Overview
It is the second stoppage for trains in Dhaka, after the Kamalapur railway station. Trains come from India and locally Khulna, Jessore, Noakhali, Sylhet, Rajshahi, Chittagong, Comilla, and many important towns and cities. Its rail tracks are Dual gauge which provide both Meter gauge and Broad gauge. Therefore, Broad gauge trains from Rajshahi, Khulna and the Maitree Express can stop at that station easily. The station has two platforms.

In 2014 railways authorities carried out drives to demolish illegally built structures in the parking lot.

References

External links
 

Uttara
Railway stations in Dhaka District
Airport railway stations in Bangladesh
Transport in Dhaka
Railway stations opened in 1981
1981 establishments in Bangladesh